Anatomy of Love is the fourth album by Vikki Carr, released in 1965 on the  Liberty Records label. The album sleeve included a liner note by Ethel Merman praising Vikki's talent.

Track listing

Side 1
"Put on a Happy Face" (Charles Strouse, Lee Adams) - 2:38
"Them There Eyes" (Maceo Pinkard, Doris Tauber, William Tracey) - 1:58
"None But the Lonely Heart" (Dave Pell, Mort Garson) - 2:53
"Baby Face" (Harry Akst, Benny Davis) - 2:40
"Heartaches" (Al Hoffman, John Klenner) - 2:17
"I’ve Grown Accustomed to His Face" (Alan Jay Lerner, Frederick Loewe) - 2:33

Side 2
"Everything I’ve Got" (Richard Rodgers, Lorenz Hart) - 2:08
"Cross Your Heart" (Buddy DeSylva, Lewis Gensler) - 2:37
"Look at That Face" (Leslie Bricusse, Anthony Newley) - 2:42
"I Only Have Eyes for You" (Harry Warren, Al Dubin) - 2:18
"That’s All" (Bob Haymes, Alan Brandt) - 2:14
”Real Live Boy” (Carolyn Leigh, Cy Coleman) - 1:58

NB: Timings are actual from an original LP

Production
Produced by: Dave Pell
Arranged by: Bob Florence & Mort Carson
Engineers: “Lanky” Linstrot & Dave Weichman
Album cover design: Studio 5, Inc.
Album cover photograph: John Engstead

References

1965 albums
Liberty Records albums
Vikki Carr albums